Yermotayevo (Yürmätaw) is a rural locality (a village) in Tukansky Selsoviet, Beloretsky District, Bashkortostan, Russia. The population was 5 as of 2010. There are 6 streets.

Geography 
Yermotayevo is located 84 km southwest of Beloretsk (the district's administrative centre) by road. Komarovo is the nearest rural locality.

References 

Rural localities in Beloretsky District